Gerard Anthony Williams (born May 25, 1952) is a former American football cornerback in the National Football League (NFL) for the Washington Redskins, San Francisco 49ers, and St. Louis Cardinals.  He also was a member of the Birmingham Americans and Birmingham Vulcans in the World Football League (WFL). He played college football at Langston University.

Early years
Williams attended Northeast High School in Oklahoma City, Oklahoma. He accepted a football scholarship from Langston University.

In 2014, he was inducted into the Langston University Athletic Hall of Fame.

Professional career

Dallas Cowboys
Williams was signed as an undrafted free agent by the Dallas Cowboys after the 1974 NFL Draft. He was released before the start of the season.

Birmingham Americans (WFL)
On September 17, 1974, he signed as a free agent with the Birmingham Americans of the World Football League. He was named the starter at right cornerback and had 4 interceptions. 

In 1975, the Americans suffered a financial crisis and were replaced by the Birmingham Vulcans. Williams played in 9 games and had 3 interceptions before the league folded.

Los Angeles Rams
In 1975, he signed as a free agent with the Los Angeles Rams. He was released on August 11.

Washington Redskins
On April 6, 1976, he was signed as a free agent by the Washington Redskins. He was a backup at left corenerback behind Pat Fischer. In 1977, he became a starter after Fischer suffered a pinched back nerve. He started 11 games and posted 4 interceptions. 

In 1978, he was passed on the depth chart by Lemar Parrish. Williams regained his starting position after Parrish was lost for the season with a fractured forearm, finishing with 5 starts and 4 interceptions. He was released on August 27, 1979.

San Francisco 49ers
On September 6, 1979, he signed as a free agent with the San Francisco 49ers. He started 14 games at right cornerback and registered 4 interceptions. He was released on September 1, 1980.

St. Louis Cardinals
On October 22, 1980, he was signed by the St. Louis Cardinals. He was waived on November 19.

San Francisco 49ers
On November 20, 1980, he was re-signed by the San Francisco 49ers. He was released on May 14, 1981.

References

External links
 
 World Football League Statistics

1952 births
Living people
Sportspeople from Oklahoma City
Players of American football from Oklahoma
American football cornerbacks
Langston Lions football players
Birmingham Americans players
Birmingham Vulcans players
Washington Redskins players
San Francisco 49ers players
St. Louis Cardinals (football) players